Héctor Andrés Bracamonte (born 16 February 1978) is an Argentine football manager and former player who played as a striker.

Career
Born in Río Cuarto, Córdoba, Bracamonte started his career at Boca Juniors 1998, he played only 1 game for the club before moving down a division to the Argentine 2nd division with Club Atlético Los Andes before moving to Spain to play for CD Badajoz.

In 2002 Bracamonte returned to Argentina to play for Boca again, but after only one season he moved to Russia to play for Torpedo Metallurg (renamed FC Moscow the same season). He made a total of 39 appearances during his second spell at Boca in all competitions, scoring 17 goals.

In 2003 Bracamonte played nine matches for Torpedo Metallurg, scoring five goals. Bracamonte scored 10 goals in 30 matches and became the club's top scorer the following season. He became popular with the Moscow fans due to his various stylish haircuts. Once he wore long curly hair Bracamonte was nicknamed "Pushkin" (a Russian famous poet).

During the season 2005 he scored six goals in 27 matches including the one against FC Spartak Moscow that resembled the famous Diego Maradona's Goal of the Century, dribbling past three opponents and the goalkeeper.

Bracamonte is FC Moscow's record holder for most league games played for the club with 145 appearances. On 29 July 2009 FC Terek Grozny signed Bracamonte from FC Moscow on a two-year deal. Whilst Ruud Gullit was manager of Terek, Bracamonte was a player-coach. 
Bracamonte left Terek in the summer of 2011, and moved to fellow Russian Premier League side FC Rostov. Bracamonte left Rostov In June 2012 upon the completion of his one-year contract.

Coaching career
In 2015, Baracamonte returned to Boca Juniors, this time as a youth coach. He was released at the end of 2019. On 16 January 2020, he was hired as a youth coordinator at Huracan. He resigned in March 2021.

Career statistics

Club

Personal
His nicknames are "Braca" and "Pushkin".

References

External links
 Argentine Primera statistics at Futbol XXI  
 Statistics at Football-Lineups

Argentine footballers
Association football forwards
Boca Juniors footballers
Club Atlético Los Andes footballers
Rosario Central footballers
People from Río Cuarto, Córdoba
1979 births
Living people
Argentine sportspeople of Spanish descent
CD Badajoz players
FC Moscow players
FC Akhmat Grozny players
FC Rostov players
Expatriate footballers in Russia
Argentine expatriate footballers
Argentine Primera División players
Russian Premier League players
Argentine expatriate sportspeople in Russia
Argentine expatriate sportspeople in Spain
Argentine football managers
Cerro Largo F.C. managers
Argentine expatriate sportspeople in Uruguay
Expatriate football managers in Uruguay
Sportspeople from Córdoba Province, Argentina